The Ministry of Religious Affairs is a ministry of Tunisia. The head office is in Tunis.

References

External links

 Ministry of Religious Affairs 

Religious organisations based in Tunisia
Religious affairs
Tunisia